Móra la Nova (Mora la Nueva in Spanish) is a municipality in the comarca, or district, of the Ribera d'Ebre in Catalonia, Spain. It is situated on the left bank of the Ebre river, facing the district capital Móra d'Ebre.
It is served by a RENFE railway station on the line between Tarragona and Zaragoza and by the N-420 road to Gandesa and Reus.

Demography

References

 Panareda Clopés, Josep Maria; Rios Calvet, Jaume; Rabella Vives, Josep Maria (1989). Guia de Catalunya, Barcelona: Caixa de Catalunya.  (Spanish).  (Catalan).

External links
Official website 
 Government data pages 

Municipalities in Ribera d'Ebre
Populated places in Ribera d'Ebre